The 2016 ASEAN University Games, officially known as the 18th ASEAN University Games, was a Southeast Asian university multi-sports event held in Singapore. This was the third time Singapore hosted the ASEAN University Games, and its first time since 1994. Previously, Singapore also hosted the 1986 games.

The games was held from 10 to 19 July 2016, although several events had commenced from 9 July 2016. Around 1000 athletes from 11 participating nations participated at the games which featured 173 events in 15 sports. It was opened by Ong Ye Kung, the acting minister of education of Singapore at the Nanyang Technological University. The final medal tally was led by Thailand, with host Singapore in fifth place.

Venues
The 18th ASEAN University Games had 15 venues for the games with the Nanyang Technological University served as the athletes' village.

Marketing

Motto
The official motto of the 2016 ASEAN University Games is In Celebration of Diversity and Unity. It was chosen to represent celebration of common goals, achievements, and love of sport, showcase of dedication, skills, and sense of fair play and celebration of passion to excel despite the difference in racial and lingual identity.

Logo
The logo of the 2016 ASEAN University Games is an image of the stylised brush strokes of the ASEAN University Games acronym, AUG surrounded by 11 stars of blue, yellow and red colour. The stylised brush strokes of the logo represents the youth, energy, and vibrancy of the games. The eleven stars, representing the 10 ASEAN countries and the candidate nation Timor-Leste that participates at the games. The brush stroke across the letter G that slants upward towards the first of the eleven stars represents the idea that sport provides a pathway for bringing people together to create and share common goals and purpose. The three colours of the stars, which are red, blue, and yellow, the common colours of the ASEAN countries, represent the inclusiveness of the university games. The logo overall, represents the aspirations of the ASEAN countries through sports and also the diversity and unity of the participants.

Mascot
The mascot of the 2016 ASEAN University Games is a lion named Nila, which is also previously the mascot of the 2015 Southeast Asian Games and the 2015 ASEAN Para Games. The name comes from Sang Nila Utama, the founder of Singapura. Nila has a red mane and heart-shaped face and is described as courage, passionate and friendly. The rehash of Nila as the mascot of the games is meant to promote friendship and ASEAN solidarity in the youth of ASEAN through sports.

The games

Opening ceremony
The opening ceremony was held at the Nanyang Technological University Auditorium at 20:00 (SST) on 10 July 2016. Before the opening ceremony, Singapore university students put up a series of performance with mascot Nila making its appearance for a brief while. The Opening ceremony begins with the performance by Singapore Dance Crew, followed by the parade of athletes from the participating nations of the games, began with the Brunei delegate. The Singaporean delegate received the warmest welcome when they marched into the auditorium. After the athletes marched into the auditorium, the National Anthem of Singapore was sung by Sophie Zara. After that, Dr. Tan Eng Liang, the Chairman of the games organising committee and the vice president of the Singapore National Olympic Council and Prof Datuk Dr Abdullah Mohamad Said, the president of ASEAN University Sports Council then gave their respective speech and the games was declared open by acting minister of education of Singapore, Mr Ong Ye Kung after he gave his speech. After the games was declared open, Mervyn Teo took the athletes' oath and Mohd Azhar Bin Yusof took the judge's oath. Ang Han Teng and Nur Shafiqa Binti Sheik Alauddin then took the torch into the auditorium and lit the cauldron on the stage. The ceremony concludes with a series of dance performance, including the traditional dances of Singapore's main races by Singapore university students.

Closing ceremony
The closing ceremony was held at the National University of Singapore Town Green at 20:00 (SST) on 19 July 2016. The closing ceremony begins with the participating athletes walked to the center of the field, followed by a dance performance by Singapore university students. After that, Dr. Tan Eng Liang, the Chairman of the games organising committee and the vice president of the Singapore National Olympic Council and Prof Datuk Dr Abdullah Mohamad Said, the president of ASEAN University Sports Council then gave their respective speech and the games was declared close by Ms Sim Ann, Senior Minister of State of the Ministry of Culture, Community and Youth and Ministry of Finance. Sophie Zara then performed a song, with the games' flags lowered and the cauldron extinguished. After that, the ASEAN University Games responsibility was handed over to Myanmar, host of the 2018 ASEAN University Games where Dr Thien Wi, President of the Myanmar University Sports Federation receive the ASEAN University Sports Federation flag as its symbol. The national flag of Myanmar was raised as the National Anthem of Myanmar was played. The ceremony concluded with a Myanmar Segment Performance and an after-ceremony rock concert, featuring rock bands from five different Singapore universities.

Participating nations

Sports

Calendar

Medal table
Source:

Results

Archery

Athletics

Badminton

Basketball

Canoeing

Fencing

Football

Pencak silat

Swimming

References

External links
 2016 ASEAN University Games official website

2016
2016 in multi-sport events
2016 in Singaporean sport
2016 in Asian sport
International sports competitions hosted by Singapore
Multi-sport events in Singapore